The Frame Cottage is a historic house located at 183 Prospect St. in Tonopah, Nevada. The wood-frame home was built c. 1909. The house features a gable roof with pediment-like gables, a porch with a pediment, classically influenced boxed eaves, and a symmetrical, "T"-shaped design. While frame houses were once common in Tonopah, the house is one of the few intact local examples of a frame home with a detailed design.

The house was added to the National Register of Historic Places on May 20, 1982.

References

Houses on the National Register of Historic Places in Nevada
Neoclassical architecture in Nevada
National Register of Historic Places in Tonopah, Nevada
Houses in Nye County, Nevada